The First Battle of Villers-Bretonneux (30 March – 5 April 1918), took place during Operation Michael, part of the German spring offensive on the Western Front. The offensive began against the British Fifth Army and the Third Army on the Somme and pushed back the British and French reinforcements on the north side of the Somme. The capture of Villers-Bretonneux, close to Amiens, a strategically important road- and rail-junction, would have brought the Germans within artillery-range. In late March, Australian troops were brought south from Belgium as reinforcements to help shore up the line and in early April the Germans launched an attack to capture Villers-Bretonneux. After a determined defence by British and Australian troops, the attackers were close to success until a counter-attack by the 9th Australian Infantry Brigade and by British troops, late in the afternoon of 4 April, restored the line and halted the German advance on Amiens.

Background
In early 1918, following the capitulation of the Russian Empire, the end of the fighting on the Eastern Front allowed the Germans to transfer a significant amount of manpower and equipment to the Western Front. With the general position for the Germans looking weak, the German commander, Erich Ludendorff, decided to go on the offensive. On 21 March 1918, Operation Michael was launched and the attack was aimed at the weakest part of the British lines, along the Somme River. By 5 April, the Germans had gained  of British held territory. Two other operations were launched, one near Armentières, one near Reims.  All three operations were eventually halted by the Allies.

Battle
In late March 1918, the German army advanced towards the vital rail-head at Amiens, pushing the British line back towards the town of Villers-Bretonneux. On 29 March the 9th Australian Brigade, consisting of four infantry battalions, had been detached from the 3rd Australian Division and sent south from Belgium to help prevent a breach of the line between the British Fifth Army (General Hubert Gough) and the French First Army (General Marie-Eugène Debeney) that was positioned to the south.

On 30 March the Germans attacked around Le Hamel and although this was turned back, they succeeded in making gains around Hangard Wood. Five days later, the Germans renewed their drive towards Villers-Bretonneux. Part of the German attack fell on the centre and left of the French First Army. The French line fell back but a counter-attack regained much of the ground. From north to south the line was held by British and Australian troops of the 14th (Light) Division, the 35th Australian Battalion and the 18th (Eastern) Division. By 4 April the 14th (Light) Division, around Le Hamel had fallen back under attack from the German 228th Division. The Australians held off the 9th Bavarian Reserve Division and the 18th (Eastern) Division repulsed the German Guards Ersatz Division and 19th Division. The British were forced to retire by the retreat of the 14th (Light) Division, where the 41st Brigade had been pushed back for  "in some disorder" and then retired to a ridge another  back, which left the right flank of the 42nd Brigade uncovered.

The line west of Le Hamel was reinforced by the arrival of the 15th Australian Brigade. In the afternoon, the Germans resumed their efforts and pushed the 18th (Eastern) Division in the south, at which point Villers-Bretonneux appeared about to fall. The Germans came within  of the town but Colonel Goddard of the 35th Australian Battalion, in command of the sector, ordered a surprise late afternoon counter-attack on 4 April, by the 36th Australian Battalion with  supported by a company from the 35th Australian Battalion and his reserve, the 6th Battalion London Regiment. Advancing by section rushes, they pushed the Germans back towards Monument Wood and then north of Lancer Wood and forced two German divisions to retreat from Villers-Bretonneux. Flanking movements by British cavalry and Australian infantry from the 33rd Battalion and 34th Battalion helped consolidate the Australian gains.

Aftermath

Analysis
Further fighting around the village took place later in the month during the Second Battle of Villers-Bretonneux. The attack on Villers-Bretonneux was the last significant German attack of Operation Michael (known to the British as the First Battle of the Somme, 1918). After the failure of the German forces to achieve their objectives, Ludendorff ended the offensive to avoid a battle of attrition.

Casualties
The 9th Australian Brigade had  from  engaged. The 9th Australian Brigade recorded  German soldiers on their front and the 18th (Eastern) Division had "severe" losses and took  from the 9th Bavarian Reserve, Guards Ersatz and 19th divisions.

Footnotes

References

Further reading

Books
 
 

Websites

External links

 Australian War Memorial – Australian Military Units – Battle of Villers-Bretonneux
 Diggerhistory.com – Battle of Villers-Bretonneux
 First battle of Villers-Bretonneux

Conflicts in 1918
1918 in France
Battles of World War I involving Australia
Battles of World War I involving Germany
Battles of World War I involving the United Kingdom
Battle honours of the Rifle Brigade
March 1918 events
April 1918 events